The 1993 Virginia Slims Championships was a professional women's tennis tournament played on indoor carpet courts at the Madison Square Garden in New York City, United States between November 15 and November 21, 1993. It was the 23rd edition of the end-of-season event, eligible for the top-ranked singles and doubles players on the Women's Tennis Association (WTA) tour. First-seeded Steffi Graf won the singles title and earned $250,000 first-prize money.

Finals

Singles

 Steffi Graf defeated  Arantxa Sánchez Vicario, 6–1, 6–4, 3–6, 6–1

Doubles

 Gigi Fernández /  Natalia Zvereva defeated  Jana Novotná /  Larisa Savchenko Neiland, 6–3, 7–5

Prize money 

Doubles prize money is per team.

External links
 
 ITF tournament edition details
 Tournament draws

WTA Tour Championships
WTA Tour Championships
WTA Tour Championships
WTA Tour Championships
1990s in Manhattan
WTA Tour Championships
Madison Square Garden
Sports competitions in New York City
Sports in Manhattan
Tennis tournaments in New York City